Luboš Pelánek (born 21 July 1981 in Třebíč) is a Czech former professional road bicycle racer.

Major results
2002
 2nd Overall Grand Prix Bradlo
2008
 9th Giro dell'Appennino

References

External links

1981 births
Living people
Czech male cyclists
Sportspeople from Třebíč